The Jewin Welsh Presbyterian Chapel (Welsh: Eglwys Gymraeg Jewin) is a Presbyterian Church of Wales church in Clerkenwell, London, England.

The current building was opened in 1960 on a site adjoining the Golden Lane Estate. It replaced a chapel built in 1878–1879 that was destroyed in World War II during the air raids in September 1940. The congregation had moved there in 1879 from nearby Jewin Crescent, a site now incorporated into the Barbican. The Jewin Crescent chapel had opened in 1822, following a move from Wilderness Row, Clerkenwell. The first services had taken place in c. 1774 in Cock Lane, Smithfield. The current building was designed by Caroe and Partners in a Swedish-inspired form of modern architecture sometimes called the New Humanism.

After a dramatic fall in the congregation, in 2013 London-based BBC News presenter Huw Edwards, who occasionally substitutes as the chapel's organist, agreed to lead a campaign to save the building and the chapel, to keep the traditions of the London Welsh community alive. Welsh First Minister Carwyn Jones chose the campaign as his input to BBC Wales Today for Children in Need 2013.

References

External links
Capeli Cymraeg Llundain
Capel Jewin

Presbyterian Church of Wales
Presbyterian organizations established in the 18th century
Welsh emigration

Churches completed in 1960
Churches in the London Borough of Islington
20th-century Presbyterian churches
Buildings and structures in Clerkenwell